Isau may refer to:

 Iranian Students Association in the United States (ISAU)
 Longan, in some places locally known as isau, a fruit-producing tree
 Ralf Isau, German writer

See also 
 Isao, a Japanese name
 Esau, a Biblical figure